Leslie Kalai (born 6 December 1984) is a Papua New Guinean footballer who is a goalkeeper. He plays on both the domestic and international levels, for Hekari United and Papua New Guinea, respectively.

Club career
Kalai transferred to Hekari United in January 2011, on a free transfer. His given transfer value is €50,000.

International career
Kalai was selected for the Papua New Guinean 2012 OFC Nations Cup roster, where his side finished last in their group, recording 3 losses and no wins. As far in his career, he has appeared in 3 FIFA World Cup qualifiers, a 1–1 draw with Fiji, a 1–2 defeat at the hands of New Zealand, and 1–0 defeat to the Solomon Islands.

FIFA match statistics

References

1984 births
Living people
Papua New Guinean footballers
Papua New Guinea international footballers
Hekari United players
Association football goalkeepers
2012 OFC Nations Cup players
2016 OFC Nations Cup players